Pasarel Island is an ice-free island in the Aitcho group on the west side of English Strait in the South Shetland Islands, Antarctica. Extending . The area was visited by early 19th century sealers.

Named after the settlement of Dolni (Lower) Pasarel in western Bulgaria.

Location
Bulgarian mapping in 2009.

See also 
 Composite Gazetteer of Antarctica
 List of Antarctic islands south of 60° S
 SCAR
 Territorial claims in Antarctica

Map
 L.L. Ivanov. Antarctica: Livingston Island and Greenwich, Robert, Snow and Smith Islands. Scale 1:120000 topographic map. Troyan: Manfred Wörner Foundation, 2010.  (First edition 2009. )
 Antarctic Digital Database (ADD). Scale 1:250000 topographic map of Antarctica. Scientific Committee on Antarctic Research (SCAR). Since 1993, regularly upgraded and updated.
 L.L. Ivanov. Antarctica: Livingston Island and Smith Island. Scale 1:100000 topographic map. Manfred Wörner Foundation, 2017.

References 

 Bulgarian Antarctic Gazetteer. Antarctic Place-names Commission. (details in Bulgarian, basic data in English)
 Pasarel Island. SCAR Composite Antarctic Gazetteer.

External links
 Pasarel Island. Copernix satellite image

Islands of the South Shetland Islands
Bulgaria and the Antarctic